The 2014 Team Ice Racing World Championship was the 36th edition of the Team World Championship. The final was held on 8/9 February, 2014, in Tolyatti, Russia. Russia won their 12th consecutive title and 20th title overall.

Final Classification

See also 
 2014 Individual Ice Racing World Championship
 2014 Speedway World Cup in classic speedway
 2014 Speedway Grand Prix in classic speedway

References 

Ice speedway competitions
World